Lokmanya Tilak Terminus–Karaikal Weekly Express is an express train of the Indian Railways connecting  in Maharashtra and  of Union Territory of Puducherry, near Tamilnadu. It is currently being operated with 11017/11018 train numbers on a weekly basis.

Service

The 11017/Mumbai LTT–Karaikal Weekly Express has an average speed of 53 km/hr and covers 1628 km in 30 hrs 40 mins. 11018/Karaikal–Mumbai LTT Weekly Express has an average speed of 48 km/hr and covers 1628 km in 33 hrs 45 mins. This train was initially planned to operate between Mumbai LTT to Velankanni due to huge demand from devotees but later destination changed to Karaikal.

Route and halts 

The important halts of the train are:

 
 
 
 
 
 
 
 
 
 
 
 
 
 
 
 
 
 
 Nagore

Coach composition

The train has standard LHB rakes with max speed of 130 kmph. The train consists of 23 coaches:

 1 AC II Tier
 5 AC III Tier
 1 AC III Tier Economy
 10 Sleeper coaches
 3 General
 2 Luggage cum Generator car

Traction

Both trains are hauled by a Kalyan Loco Shed-based WDM-3D or WDP-4D diesel locomotive from Kurla to Guntakal & Royapuram Loco Shed-based WAP-4 electric locomotive from Guntakal to Chennai Egmore and Golden Rock based WDM-3D pulls to its end & vice versa.

Rake sharing 

The train shares its rake with 11011/12 Lokmanya Tilak Terminus–Hazur Sahib Nanded Express

Direction reversal

Train reverses its direction 1 times:

Schedule

Notes

External links 
 11017 Karaikal Express
 11018 Karaikal Express
 11017/Mumbai LTT – Karaikal Weekly Express India Rail Info
 11018/Karaikal – Mumbai LTT Weekly Express India Rail Info

References 

Express trains in India
Rail transport in Maharashtra
Rail transport in Andhra Pradesh
Rail transport in Karnataka
Rail transport in Tamil Nadu
Rail transport in Puducherry
Transport in Karaikal
Transport in Mumbai
Railway services introduced in 2013